The buck moth (Hemileuca maia) is a common insect found in oak forests, stretching in the United States from peninsular Florida to New England, and as far west as Texas and Kansas. It was first described by Dru Drury in 1773. The larvae typically emerge in a single generation in the spring. The larvae are covered in hollow spines that are attached to a poison sac. The poison can cause symptoms ranging from stinging, itching and burning sensations to nausea. Subspecies Hemileuca maia maia is listed as endangered in the US state of Connecticut.

The larvae feed on various oaks including scrub oak (Quercus ilicifolia), live oak (Quercus virginiana), blackjack oak (Quercus marilandica), white oak (Quercus alba), and dwarf chinquapin oak (Quercus prinoides).

Eggs are typically laid in spiral clusters on oak twigs. Mature larvae enter the soil or leaf litter to pupate in late July and emerge between October and the following February as moths to mate and lay eggs.   In Louisiana, particularly in cities such as Baton Rouge or New Orleans, where use of live oaks as street trees is extensive, the caterpillars can become a significant nuisance for humans. The caterpillars of this moth can also be a nuisance in some areas of Virginia, such as the Goshen Scout Reservation, where they are infamous for stinging people going to a summer camp in the area.

Taxonomy  
The buck moth is in family Saturniidae and genus Hemileuca. There are currently 34 known species in genus Hemileuca. Due to similarities in larval characteristics, adult phenotype and food sources, several groups have been formed within the genus. H. maia is member of the maia group of genus Hemileuca.

There are eleven species in the Hemileuca maia species complex and four subspecies of H. maia:
Hemileuca maia (Drury, 1773)
Hemileuca maia maia (Drury, 1773)
Hemileuca maia sandra Pavulaan, 2020
Hemileuca maia warreni Pavulaan, 2020
Hemileuca maia orleans Pavulaan, 2020 
Hemileuca maia menyanthevora Pavulaan, 2020
Hemileuca grotei Grote & Robinson, 1868
Hemileuca nevadensis Stretch, 1872
Hemileuca juno Packard, 1872
Hemileuca diana Packard, 1874
Hemileuca lucina H. Edwards, 1887
Hemileuca artemis Packard, 1893
Hemileuca slosseri Peigler & Stone, 1989
Hemileuca peigleri Lemaire, 1981
Hemileuca artemis Packard, 1893
Hemileuca iroquois Cryan & Dirig, 2020

Hemileuca maia menyanthevora was originally described as a subspecies of Hemileuca maia on April 1, 2020. Cryan & Dirig (2020) described the same taxon as species Hemileuca iroquois on April 2, 2020. The names have not yet been formally synonymized in a publication, nor has the status (species/subspecies) of either name been changed.

References

External links
 Forestpests.org page on Buck moth
 Buck moth on the UF / IFAS Featured Creatures Web site

Hemileucinae
Insects of North America
Moths described in 1773